Mohamed Youssef  (born January 10, 1986) is a Libyan professional basketball player. From 2013-2015, he played for the El Jaish SC club of the Qatari Basketball League.

He represented Libya's national basketball team at the official 2009 FIBA Africa Championship, where he recorded most steals for Libya.

References

External links
 Real GM profile
 FIBA Archive profile
  Asia-basket.com profile

1986 births
Living people
Forwards (basketball)
Libyan men's basketball players
Libyan expatriates in Qatar
People from Benghazi